Dresdner Bank AG was a German bank and was based in Frankfurt. It was one of Germany's largest banking corporations and was acquired by competitor Commerzbank in May 2009.

History

19th century 
The Dresdner Bank was established on 12 November 1872 through the conversion of the private banks Michael Kaskel and Bernhard Gutmann. The Dresdner Bank founding consortium consisted of Allgemeine Deutsche Creditanstalt (Leipzig), Berliner Handels-Gesellschaft (Berlin), Deutsche Vereinsbank (Frankfurt am Main), Deutsche Effecten- und Wechselbank (Frankfurt am Main) and Anglo-Deutsche Bank (Hamburg) with an initial capital of 8 million Thalers (24 million Marks) and 30 employees in Wilsdruffer Strasse in Dresden. From 1872 until his retirement in 1920,  (1840-1925) was chairman of the board. In the 1870s, the Dresdner Bank acquired smaller regional institutes and several banks. The new branch in Berlin quickly exceeded the office in Dresden; therefore, the registered office moved to Berlin in 1884 leaving the place of jurisdiction in Dresden until 1950. After few new acquisitions, (even the acquisition of founder of Anglo-Deutsche Bank) opened the first international branch in London in 1895.

By 1900, Dresdner bank had the largest German branch network. In all, the Dresdner Bank had (beginning of 1909) 27 branches, all, with the exception of the one in London, being located in Germany. In addition it had one silent partner and 57 deposit offices, 23 being in Berlin. In 1905 a close alliance was formed with the banking house of J. P. Morgan & Co., New York, for joint action in international finance and issue operations, particularly the absorption of American securities by German investors. Operations in the orient and South America were carried on jointly in cooperation with the A. Schaaffhausen'scher Bankverein. During the First World War, the London branch was forced to close; however, the branch network itself expanded.

Early 20th century and World War II
After the banking crisis in 1931 the German Reich owned 66% and Deutsche Golddiskontbank  owned 22% of Dresdner Bank shares. Its deputy director was Dr Schacht, Minister of Economy under Nazism. The bank was reprivatised in 1937.

During World War II, Dresdner Bank controlled various banks in countries under German Occupation.  It took over the Böhmische Escompte-Bank in Prague, the Societatea Bancară Română in Bucharest, the Handels- und Kreditbank in Riga, the Kontinentale Bank in Brussels, and Banque d'Athenes. It maintained majority control of the Croatian Landerbank and the Kommerzialbank in Kraków and the Deutsche Handels- und Kreditbank in Bratislava. It took over the French interests in the Hungarian General Bank and the Greek Credit Bank, and it founded the Handelstrust West N. V. in Amsterdam. It also controlled Banque Bulgare de Commerce in Sofia and the Deutsche Orient-Bank in Turkey.

As a result of World War II 80% of the bank's buildings were destroyed, costing the bank 162 offices in 56 locations.

Post World War II era 

Monetary reform and the introduction of the Deutsche Mark in 1948 helped return banking to normality.

On 30 July 1977 in Oberursel (Taunus), Jürgen Ponto, the chairman of the board of directors of Dresdner Bank, was shot in his home during an attempted kidnapping by the RAF. Ponto later died from his injuries.

Dresdner Bank expanded its network with acquisition and opening new offices not only in Europe but also in the United States, Singapore, Canada, Australia, Japan, Hong Kong, and China. Dresdner Bank was the first to open its own office in former eastern Germany in Dresden on 2 January 1990. After the acquisition of Kleinwort Benson in 1995 to form its investment-banking arm Dresdner Kleinwort, Dresdner Bank took over the American investment bank Wasserstein Perella Group Inc., New York in 2000. This investment banking unit was then renamed Dresdner Kleinwort Wasserstein.

Allianz era 
In 2002 Dresdner Bank became a wholly owned subsidiary of the insurance corporation Allianz. In July 2006 Dresdner Kleinwort, dropped Wasserstein from their name and went through a re-organization of corporate bank, capital markets and investment bank. The arm made up of capital markets and investment banking.

In 2008 it was reported that Allianz was looking to dispose of Dresdner Bank. British banking group Lloyds TSB were amongst those rumoured to be interested. However, by July that year Lloyds TSB had denied any interest in making a bid.

Takeover by Commerzbank 

On August 31, 2008, Commerzbank announced that it would acquire Dresdner Bank for EUR 9.8 billion. Dresdner Bank was legally merged with Commerzbank on 11 May 2009 and ceased to be an independent entity.

Acquisition by Deutsche Bank 
In 2009, Deutsche Bank announced it will integrate the Dresdner Agency Security Lending business into its trust and securities services (TSS) business in global transaction banking (GTB).

Controversies

Nazi era 
Dresdner Bank was known as the bank of choice for Heinrich Himmler's SS.

The bank took part early on in Nazi Germany's confiscation of Jewish property and wealth. The bank helped to finance concentration camps, including Auschwitz.

The bank was closely involved in the occupation of Europe, "essentially acting as the bank of the SS in Poland".

Gazprom 
Dresdner Bank attempted to get a banking operating license in Saint Petersburg, where former KGB agent Vladimir Putin was in charge of foreign economic relations. Dresdner Bank appointed Matthias Warnig, a former Stasi agent and Vladimir Putin's former KGB contact, to negotiate with Putin. The office was opened in 1991. Warnig became chairman of the board of directors of Dresdner Bank ZAO, Dresdner Bank Russian subsidiary.

The bank has had a lucrative business relationship with Gazprom and the state oil company Rosneft. The bank advised on the forced sale of Yukos assets.

2008 Dividend stripping 
In 2017, Frankfurt prosecutors, together with federal crime police and tax officials, conducted searches of Commerzbank offices as well as the flats of three suspects in Frankfurt and nearby Hanau about a "tax evasion probe in which several current and former managers are suspected of evading 40 million euros ($47 million) in taxes via dividend stripping, also known as "cum-ex" transactions". The investigation also extends to trades in 2008 at Dresdner Bank, which was taken over by Commerzbank in 2009.

Notes

References

External links 

 
 
 History - Timeline
 Allianz Group corporate website
 Dresdner Kleinwort
 Dresdner-Cetelem
 Yahoo! - Dresdner Bank AG Company Profile
 

 
Commerzbank
Allianz
Defunct banks of Germany
Banks established in 1872
Banks disestablished in 2009
2009 mergers and acquisitions
German brands
Companies involved in the Holocaust
Companies formerly listed on the Tokyo Stock Exchange
German companies disestablished in 2009
German companies established in 1872

fi:Dresdner Bank